The 1860 Florida gubernatorial election was held on October 1, 1860. Democratic Nominee John Milton defeated Opposition candidate Edward D. Hopkins.

Candidates

Democratic

Nominee 

 John Milton

Eliminated at party convention 

 John Finlayson
 Philip Dell
 George Whitfield
 E. Blackburn

Opposition

Nominee 

 Edward D. Hopkins

General election

Results

Results by County

See also 

 1860 United States presidential election in Florida
 1860 United States House of Representatives election in Florida

References 

1860 elections
Florida
Florida gubernatorial elections